The Allgemeine Bauzeitung was founded in 1836 by the architect Ludwig Förster and was the most important architectural publication of the Austrian monarchy. The magazine was based in Vienna. It was shut down in 1918.

See also
List of magazines in Austria

References

External links

Allgemeinen Bauzeitung (scans) on the website of the Austrian National Library

1836 establishments in the Austrian Empire
1918 disestablishments in Austria-Hungary
Architecture magazines
Defunct magazines published in Austria
German-language magazines
Magazines established in 1836
Magazines disestablished in 1918
Magazines published in Vienna